The Political Machine is a government simulation game series from Stardock, in which the player leads a campaign to elect the President of the United States. The player accomplishes this goal by traveling from state to state and engaging in a variety of activities to either raise money or raise poll numbers.

Games

The Political Machine

The Political Machine is the first game in the series.

The Political Machine 2008

The Political Machine 2008 is the second game in the series.

The Political Machine Express 2008
The Political Machine Express 2008 is the third game in the series and was free to download upon release.

The Political Machine 2012

The Political Machine 2012 is the fourth game in the series.

The Political Machine 2016

The Political Machine 2016 is the fifth game in the series.

The Political Machine 2020

The Political Machine 2020 is the sixth game in the series.

Candidates and characters
21 Presidents of the United States and 69 other candidates have appeared as playable throughout the series, including George Washington, Abraham Lincoln, Bill Clinton, Hillary Clinton, Donald Trump, George Bush, Jeb Bush, John Kasich, Paul Ryan, Jim Webb, and Jill Stein. Candidates are added and removed as candidates announce themselves and as Stardock chooses.

Aside from candidates, the player can be invited onto cable news shows parodying real life equivalents. Such parodies have included takes on The Colbert Report, The O'Reilly Factor, Good Morning America, The Late Show with Stephen Colbert, Tucker Carlson Tonight, and The Ben Shapiro Show.

Reception

References

External links

Stardock games
United States presidential elections in popular culture
Video game franchises
Video game franchises introduced in 2004
Political video games